Hazel Creek is a stream in Georgia, and is a tributary of the Soque River.

Course

At this confluence, Hazel Creek again turns sharply, this time to the southwest, and heads in the direction of Demorest. At its confluence with Camp Creek in Demorest Lake, Hazel Creek turns to the northwest once again, and winds through Demorest and on in a northwesterly direction for another , before flowing into the Soque River just southwest of Habersham Mills Lake.

Sub-watershed details

See also
 Water Resource Region
 South Atlantic-Gulf Water Resource Region
 Apalachicola basin

References

External links
Soque River Watershed Association

Hazel Creek (Soque River)
Rivers of Habersham County, Georgia